Kumnan Methodist Church (KMC) is the Korean Methodist Church-affiliated church in Jungnang-gu, Mangu-dong in Seoul, South Korea. Kumnan Methodist church, the registered church members are 140,000, is known as the world's largest Methodist church. The 19th World Methodist Conference was held in the Kumnan Methodist Church.

References

External links
  Kumnan Methodist Church

Churches in Seoul
Buildings and structures in Jungnang District